The League of Wisconsin Municipalities is a nonprofit and nonpartisan association of cities and villages that acts as a lobbying organization and legal resource for Wisconsin municipalities.  The League is located in Madison, Wisconsin.

References

External links
League of Wisconsin Municipalities

Organizations based in Madison, Wisconsin